This is a list of defunct automobile manufacturers of the United States. They were discontinued for various reasons, such as bankruptcy of the parent company, mergers, or being phased out.

A

 A Automobile Company (1910–1913)  'Blue & Gold' model
 Abbott-Detroit (1909–1918)  Moved to Cleveland and renamed to 'Abbott' in 1917.
 Abeln-Zehr (1911–1912)  Renamed to 'Zehr' after departure of S. Abeln in 1912.
 AC Propulsion (1997–2003)  tzero model
 Apex Motor Car Company (1920–1922)  Ace model
 Acme Motor Car Company (1903–1911)
 Adams Company (1905–1912)  'Adams-Farwell' model
 Anger Engineering Company (1913–1915)
 Aerocar Company (1905–1908)
 Aerocar International (1946–1987)
 Aircraft Products (1947)  Airscoot model
 Airway (1949–1950)
 Ajax Motors Co. (1914–1915)  Based in Seattle
 Ajax Motor Vehicle Company (1901–1903)  Based in New York City
 Aland Motor Car Company (1916–1917)
 Albany Automobile Company (1907–1908)
 Alden Sampson Company (1904)  Sampson model
 Albaugh-Dover Co. (1910–1911)  Also known as Aldo
 All-Steel Motor Car Co. (1915–1916)
 Allen Motor Company (1913–1922)  Based in Ohio
 Allen Iron & Steel Company (1913–1914)  Based in Philadelphia
 Alpena Motor Company (1910–1914)
 Alter Motor Car Company (1914–1917)
 Altham (1896–1899)
 Alcoa (1920–1922)  'Aluminum' model
 Amalgamated Machinery Corp (1917–1919)
 Ambassador (1921–1925)
 American Automobile Manufacturing Company (1911–1912)  Jonz and American models. Based in Indiana.
 American Automobile and Power Company (1904–1905)  Populaire model
 American Automobile Co. (1899–1901)  Based in New York
 American Cyclecar Co. (1914)
 American Austin (1929–1941)  Renamed to 'American Bantam' in 1935
 American Beauty (1918–1920)
 American Electric (1913–1914)  Based in Michigan
 American Electric Vehicle Co. (1896–1902)  Based in Chicago
 American Locomotive Automobile Company (1908–1913)  Also known as Alco 
 American Metal Wheel & Auto Co (1907)  Juvenile model
 American Mors (1906–1909)
 American Motor Car Company (1906–1914)
 American Motor Carriage Co. (1902–1904)
 American Motor Vehicle Co. (1916–1920)  Junior model
 American Motors (1954–1987)  Also known as AMC
 American Motors Co. (1906–1924)  Balanced Six model. Based in New Jersey
 American Motors Incorporated (1917–1922)  Amco model. Based in New York
 American Power Carriage (1899–1900)
 American Simplex (1906–1913)  Renamed to Amplex in 1910
 American Steam Automobile Co. (1924–1931)  Based in Massachusetts
 American Steam Truck Co. (1922–1924)  Based in Illinois
 American Voiturette (1913–1914)  Car-Nation models
 American Waltham (1898–1899)
 American Wheelock
 Ames, F.A. Co. (1910–1922)  Renamed to 'Ames Body Corporation' in 1915
 Ams-Sterling (1917)
 Anchor Buggy & Carriage Co. (1910–1911)
 Anderson Automobile Co. (1916–1925)
 Anderson Carriage Manufacturing Co. (1907–1910)
 Anderson Machine Co. (1906)
 Anger Engineering Company (1912–1915)  Also known as A.E.C.
 Angus (1907–1910)  Fuller model
 Anheuser-Busch (1905)  Built in St. Louis by the beer company
 Anhut (1909–1910)
 Ansted (1926–1927)
 Ansted-Lexington (1922)
 Anthony (1899–1900)
 Apperson (1902–1926)
 Apple Automobile Company (1917–1918)
 Arabian (1915–1917)
 ArBenz (1911–1918)
 Ardsley Motor Car Co. (1905–1906)
 Argo Electric Vehicle Co. (1912–1916)  Based in Saginaw, Michigan.
 Argo Motor Co. (1914–1916)  Based in Jackson, Michigan.
 Ariel Company (1905–1907)
 Aristos
 Armstrong Electric (1885–1902)
 Arnolt, S.H. Inc. (1953–1954)
 Artzberger (1904)
 Atlas Automobile Co. (1906–1907)  Based in Pittsburgh
 Atlas Motor Car Co. (1907–1913)  Based in Massachusetts. Renamed to 'Atlas-Knight' in 1912.
 Auburn Automobile Co. (1900–1936)  Based in Indiana
 Auburn Motor Chassis (1912–1915)
 Aultman (1901)
 Aurora Automobile Co. (1905–1906)  Formerly 'Aurora Carriage Top Company'
 Aurora Automatic Machinery Co. (1907–1909)
 Austen
 Austin Automobile Company (1901–1921)
 Auto-Bug (1909–1910)
 Auto Cub (1956)
 Auto Cycle (1906–1907)
 Auto Dynamic (1900–1902)
 Autoette Electric Car Co. (1948–1970)
 Automatic Transportation Co. (1921)
 Automobile Fore Carriage (1900)
 Automobile Voiturette
 Automotor (1901–1904)
 Autoparts Manufacturing Co. (1910)  King-Remick model
 Auto Tricar (1914)
 Auto Vehicle
 Avanti Motor Co. (1963–2007)
 Avery Company (1891-1928) Tractor, truck and car manufacturer

B

 Babcock, H.H. Company (1909–1913)
 Babcok Electric Carriage Co. (1906–1912)
 Baby Moose (1914)
 Bachelle Electric (1900–1903)
 Bacon (1901, 1919–1920)
 Badger (1910–1911)  Based in Wisconsin
 Bailey (1907–1910)
 Baker Electric (1899–1916)  Based in Cleveland
 Balboa (1924–1925)
 Baldner (1900–1903)
 Baldwin (1899–1901)
 Ball Steam (1868, 1902)
 Balzer (1894–1900)
 Banker (1905)
 Bantam (1914)  Distinct from American Bantam
 Barbarino (1923–1925)
 Barley Motor Car Co. (1916–1929)
 Barrows Electric (1895–1899)
 Bates Automobile Company (1904–1905)
 Bauer (1914–1916)
 Bay State (1907–1908)
 Bean-Chamberlain Manufacturing Co. (1901–1902)  Hudson model
 Beardsley (1914–1917)
 Beechcraft (1946)
 Beggs (1919–1923)
 Belden (1907–1911)
 Bell Motor Car Company (1916–1922)  Based in Pennsylvania
 Belmont Electric Auto Co. (1909–1910)
 Belmont (1916)
 Bendix (1908–1909)
 Benham Manufacturing Co. (1914)
 Ben Hur (1917–1918)  Based in Cleveland
 Benner (1909)
 Berg (1903–1905)  Based in Cleveland
 Bergdoll (1910–1913)
 Berwick Auto Car Co. (1904)
 Berkshire (1905–1912)
 Berliet
 Bertolet (1908–1910)
 Bethlehem
 Beverly (1904)
 Bi-Autogo (1908–1912)
 Biddle (1915–1922)
 Beisel Motorette Company (1914)
 Bimel (1916–1917)
 Binghamton Electric (1920)
 Binney & Burnham (1901–1902)
 Birch Motor Cars (1916–1923)
 Birmingham Motors (1921–1923)
 Black (1893, 1896–1900)
 Black Motor Company (1908–1910) Renamed to 'Black-Crow' in 1909
 Blackhawk (1903)
 Blackhawk (1929–1930)
 Bliss (1906)
 B.L.M. (1906–1907)
 Blomstrom (C.H.) Motor Co. (1902–1903)
 Blomstrom Manufacturing Co. (1907–1908)  Gyroscope model, based in Michigan.
 Blood Brothers Auto and Machine Company (1902–1906)
 BMC (1952)  Distinct from the British brand
 Boardman (1946)
 Bobbi-Kar (1945–1947)
 Boisselot (1901)
 Borbein Electric (1900, 1904–1909)
 Borland Electric (1910–1916)
 Boss Steam Car (1897–1909)
 Boston-Amesbury (1902–1903)
 Boston High Wheel (1907)
 Bour-Davis Co. (1915–1922)
 Bournonville
 Bowman Motor Car Company (1921–1922)
 Bramwell (1904–1905)
 Bramwell-Robinson (1899–1902)
 Brasie (1914–1916)
 Brazier (1902–1903)
 Brecht (1901–1903)
 Brennan (1902–1908)
 Brew-Hatcher (1904–1905)
 Brewster & Co. (1915–1925, 1934–1937)
 Briggs and Stratton (1919–1923)  Smith Flyer model
 Briggs-Detroiter Motor Car Co. (1912–1917)
 Brightwood
 Briscoe Motor Co. (1913–1923)
 Bristol (1903–1904)
 Broc Electric (1909–1916)  Based in Cleveland
 Brogan (1946–1950)
 Brook (1920–1921)
 Brooks Steamer (1927)
 Brown (1914)
 Brownie (1916)
 Browniekar (1908–1911)
 Brush Motor Car Company (1907–1912)
 Bryan Steam Car (1918–1923)
 Buckeye (1895)  Based in Indiana
 Buckmobile (1903–1905)
 Buffalo Automobile and Auto-Bi Company (1900–1902)
 Buffalo Electric (1912–1915)
 Buffum (1901–1907)
 Buggy Car Company (1908–1909)
 Bugmobile (1907–1909)  Based in Chicago
 Burdick (1909)
 Burg (1910–1913)
 Burns (1908–1912)
 Burrows (1914–1915)
 Burtt Manufacturing Co. (1902–1906)  Cannon model
 Bush (1916–1924)

C

 C-A-C (1914–1915)
 Cady Automobile Company (1899)
 California (1900–1902, 1910)
 Caloric (1903–1904)
 Camelot Motors (1981)
 Cameron (1903–1920)
 Campbell (1918–1919)
 Canda (1900–1902)
 Cannon (1902–1906)
 Cantono Electric (1904–1907)
 Car de Luxe (1906–1910)
 Carbon Motors Corporation (2003–2013)
 Cardway (1923–1924)
 Carhart (1871)
 Carhartt Automobile Company (1910–1912)
 Carlson (1904)
 Carrol
 Carroll (1908)  Distinct from Carrol
 Carroll Six (1921–1922)
 Carter Twin-Engine (1907–1908)
 Cartercar (1905–1916)
 Carthage (1914–1915)
 Case (1911–1927)  Based in Wisconsin
 C.B (1917–1918)
 Ceco (1914–1915)  Based in Chicago
 Centaur (1902–1903)
 Central (1905–1906)
 Century (1900–1903)  'Tourist' model
 Century Motor Company (1911–1915)  Renamed to 'Century Electric Car Company' in 1915
 Century Steamer (1906)
 Cornish-Friedberg Motor Car Co (1907–1909)
 Chadwick Engineering Works (1904–1916, 1960)
 Chalfant (1905–1912)
 Chalmers-Detroit (1908–1914)  Renamed to Chalmers in 1911
 Champion (1916)
 Chandler (1913–1929)
 Chapman Electric (1899–1901)
 Charles Abresch Company (1899–circa 1965)
 Chase (1907–1912)
 Checker Motors Corporation (1922–1982)
 Chelsea (1914)
 Chicago (1902)
 Chicago Electric (1899–1901)
 Chicago Motor Buggy (1908)
 Chicago Recording Scale Co (1906–1907)  Apollo model
 Chicago Steam Car (1905–1907)
 Chief (1908)
 Christie (1904–1910)
 Christman (1901–1905, 1907)
 Church-Field (1912–1913)
 Church Manufacturing Co (1903–1904)  Lenawee model
 Cincinnati Steamer (1903–1904)
 CinO (1910–1913)
 Citicar (1974–1976)
 Clark (1901)
 Clark Electric (1903–1905)
 Clark & Company (1903–1904)  Clarkmobile model
 Classic (1916–1917, 1920)
 Cleburne
 Clénet Coachworks (1975–1980)
 Clermont
 Cleveland (1902–1904)  Built in Cleveland
 Cleveland (1905–1909)
 Cleveland (1914)
 Cleveland (1919–1926)
 Climber (1919–1924)
 Clinton E. Woods Electric (1897–1901)
 Clipper (1956)
 Clough Steamer (1869)
 Cloughley (1896–1903)
 Club Car (1910–1911)
 Clyde Special
 Clymer (1908)  Based in Missouri
 Coates-Goshen (1908–1910)
 Coats Steam Car (1921–1923)
 Coda (2009–2013)
 Coey-Mitchell Automobile Company (1913–1917)
 Coggswell (1910–1911)
 Colburn (1906–1911)  Based in Denver
 ColbyDenver (1911–1914)
 Cole Motor Car Company (1909–1925)  Based in Indianapolis
 Colonial Motors Corporation (1921–1922)
 Colonial Electric Car Company (1912)
 Colt (1907)  Based in New York
 Columbia (1897–1913)
 Columbian Electric
 Columbia Motors (1916–1924)
 Columbian Electric (1914–1917)  Distinct from 'Columbia Electric'
 Columbus Buggy Company (1907–1908)
 Columbus Electric (1903–1915)  Based in Ohio
 Comet (1917–1922)  Based in Illinois
 Comet (1946–1951)
 Commerce (1907–1908)
 Commercial Motor Truck Company  Based in Ohio
 Commodore Motors Corporation (1921–1922)
 Commonwealth (1917–1922)
 Commuter Cars (1998)
 Comuta-Car (1979–1982)
 Conrad (1900–1903)
 Continental (1907–1908)
 Continental (1914)  Based in Minneapolis and Chicago
 Continental (1933–1934)
 Continental (1956–1957)
 Corbin (1904–1912)
 Corbin (1999–2003)
 Corbitt (1907–1914)
 Cord (1929–1932,1936–1937)
 Corinthian (1922–1923)
 Cornelian (1914–1915)
 Cornish-Friedberg
 Correja (1909–1914)
 Corwin (1905–1906)  Gas-au-lec model
 Cosmopolitan (1907–1910)  Distinct from the Nash Cosmopolitan
 Cotta Steam (1901–1903)
 Country Club (1903–1904)
 Courier (1904–1905)
 Courier (1909–1911)
 Courier Car Co (1912)  'Clermont' model
 Covert (1902–1907)
 Coyote Special (1909–1910)
 C.R. Patterson and Sons (1915–1939), maker of the Patterson-Greenfield automobile and later buses and trucks.
 Craig-Toledo (1907)
 Crane (1912–1920)  Renamed to Crane-Simplex in 1915
 Crane & Breed (1912–1917)
 Crawford (1904–1923)
 Crescent (1913–1914)
 Crestmobile (1901–1905)
 Cricket Cyclecar Company (1913–1914)
 Criterion
 Crompton (1902–1905)
 Crosley (1939–1952)
 Crouch (1894–1900)
 Crow-Elkhart (1911–1923)
 Crowdus Electric (1899–1902)
 Crown (1905–1907)
 Crowther (1915–1917)  Renamed to 'Crowther-Duryea' in 1917
 Croxton-Keeton (1909–1914)  Renamed to 'Croxton' in 1911
 Cruiser (1917–1919)
 Culver (1905)
 Cunningham (1907–1936)
 Cunningham Sports Cars (1951–1955)
 Clark-Carter Automobile Co (1909–1912)  Renamed to Cutting Motor Car Company in 1911
 C.V.I. Motor Car Co (1907–1908)

D

 Detroit Air-Cooled Car Company (1922–1923)
 Dagmar (1922–1927)
 Dale (1974)
 Daniels (1916–1924)
 Dan Patch (1910–1911)
 Darby Motor Car Company (1909–1910)
 Darling (1901–1902)
 Darrin (1946, 1955–1958)
 Davenport (1902)
 Davis (1908–1929)
 Davis Cyclecar Company (1914)
 Davis (1947–1949)
 Davis Steam Car (1921)
 Davis Totem (1921–1922)
 Dawson (1904)
 Dawson Auto-Mobile (1899–1901)
 Day Automobile Company (1911–1914)
 Dayton (1914)
 Dayton Electric (1911–1915)
 Deal (1905–1911)
 Decatur (1910–1911)
 Decatur (1914–1915)
 Decker (1902–1903)
 Deere-Clark (1906; Deere 1907)
 Deering Magnetic (1918–1919)
 De La Vergne (1895–1896)
 Delling (1924–1927)
 Delmore (1921–1923)
 DeLorean Motor Company (1975–1982)
 De Luxe Motor Car Company (1906–1908)
 De Mars Electric (1905–1906; Blakeslee Electric 1906; Williams Electric 1906–1907; Byrider Electric 1907–1910)
 DeMot or DeMotCar (1910–1911)
 De Motte (1904)
 Denneed (1916)
 Derain  (1908–1911)
 Desberon (1901–1904)
 De Schaum (1908–1909)
 Des Moines (1902)
 De Soto Motor Car Company (1913–1914)
 DeSoto (1928–1961)
 De Tamble (1908–1913)
 Detroit Automobile Company (1899–1901)
 Detroit Automobile Manufacturing Company (1905)
 Detroit Auto Vehicle Company (1904–1908)
 Detroit Cyclecar Company (1913–1914)
 Detroit-Dearborn Motor Car Company (1910–1911)
 Detroit Electric (1907–1939)
 Detroiter (1912–1917)
 Detroit-Oxford Motor Car Company (1905–1906)
 Detroit-Speedster (1913–1914; Saginaw Speedster 1914)
 Detroit Steam Motors Corporation (1922)
 De Vaux-Hall Motors Company (1931–1932; Continental-De Vaux 1932)
 De Vaux Continental (1932–1934)
 DeWitt (1909–1910)
 Dewabout (1900–1901)
 Dey Electric (1917–1919)
 Dey Griswold (1895–1898)
 Diamond (1914–1915)
 Diamond T (1905–1967)
 Diana (1925–1928)
 Dile (1914–1917)
 Dingfelder Motor Company (1903)
 Disbrow (1917–1918)
 Dispatch (1910)
 Dixie (1908–1910)
 Dixie (1916)
 Dixie Flyer (1916–1923)
 Doble steam car (1914–1918, 1922–1931)
 Dodge (A.M.) Company (1914–1915)
 Dodgeson Motors (1926)
 DODO (1912)
 Dolson (J.L.) & Sons (1904–1907)
 Dorris Motors Corporation (1906–1926)
 Dort Motor Car Company (1915–1924)
 Douglas (1918–1919)
 Downing Motor Company (1913–1915)
 Dragon Automobile Company (1906–1908)
 Drake (1921–1922)
 Drexel (1916–1917)
 Driggs-Seabury (1915; Driggs 1921–1923)
 Drummond (1916–1917)
 Dual-Ghia (1956–1958)
 Duck (Jackson model)
 Dudly Tool Company (1913–1915)
 Dudgeon Steam (1857, 1866)
 Duer (1907–1910)
 Duesenberg (1920–1937)
 Dumont
 Dunn (1916–1918)
 Duplex (1908–1909)
 Du Pont (1919–1931)
 Duquesne (1904–1906)
 Durant Motors (1921–1931)
 Durocar (1906–1911)
 Duryea (1893–1917)
 Dyke (or St Louis) (1899–1901; Dyke-Britton 1904)
 Dymaxion (1933)

E

 Eagle (1905–1909)
 Eagle (1988–1998)
 Eagle Electric (1915–1916)
 Eagle Rotary (1914–1915; Eagle-Macomber 1916–1918)
 Earl Motors Incorporated (1907–1908)
 Earl (1921–1923)
 Eastman (1898–1900)
 Eastman (1901–1902)
 Eaton Electric (1898–1900)
 Eck
 Eclipse Steam (1900–1903)
 Economy (1916–1919; Economy-Vogue 1920; Vogue 1921–1922)
 Eddy Electric (1900–1901)
 Edsel (1958–1960)
 Edwards-Knight (1912–1913)
 Edwards (1954–1955)
 E.H.V. (see Compound)
 Eichstaedt (1898–1902)
 Eisenhuth (1904–1908)  'Compound' model
 Elberg
 Elberon (Columbia model)
 Elbert (1914–1915)
 Elcar (1915–1931)
 Elco (1915–1917)
 Eldredge (1903–1906)
 Electra (1914–1915)
 Electric Vehicle (1897–1907)
 Electronomic
 Elgin (1916–1924)
 Elite
 Elite (1901–1902)
 Elkhart (see Crow-Elkhart or Komet)
 Elliott (1897–1899)
 Ellis
 Ellsworth (1907)
 Elmore (1893–1912)
 El Morocco (1956–1957)
 Emancipator (1909)
 Emerson (1917)
 E-M-F (1909–1912)  'Wayne' model
 Empire (1901–1902)
 Empire (1910–1919)
 Empire Steam Car (1925–1927)
 Empire Steamer (1899–1902)
 Empire Steamer (1904)
 Endurance Steam Car (1922–1924)
 Enger (1909–1917)
 Engler (W.B.) Cyclecar Company (1914–1915)
 Entz (1914)
 Erie (1899–1902)
 Erskine (1927–1930)
 Eshelman (1953–1961)
 Essex (1906)
 Essex Motor Company (1919–1932)
 Etnyre (1910–1911)
 Euclid (1908)
 Eureka (1900)
 Eureka (1907–1909)
 Evansville
 Everitt (1909–1912)
 Everybody's (1907–1909)
 Ewing (1908–1910)
 Excalibur (1965–1997)
 Excel (1914)

F

 Fageol (1900, 1917)
 Fal-Car (1909–1914)  Also known as F.A.L.
 Falcon Engineering Company (1907–1909)  Unrelated to Ford Falcon
 Falcon-Knight (1927–1929)
 Famous (1908–1909)
 Fanning (1901–1903)
 Farmack (1915–1916)
 Farner (1922–1923)
 Faulkner-Blanchard (1910)
 Federal (1907–1909)
 Federal Steam (1901–1902)
 Fenton (1913–1914)  Unrelated to Fenton Headers
 Ferris (1920–1922)
 Fey Touring (1897–1906)
 Fiberfab (1964–1983)
 Fidelia (1913–1914)
 Field (1886, 1905)
 Fina-Sport (1953–1954)
 Firestone-Columbus (1909–1915)
 Fischer-Detroit (1914)
 Fisher (1901–1905)
 Fisker Automotive (2007–2014)
 Flagler (1914)  Based in Michigan
 Flanders 20 (1910–1912)
 Flanders Manufacturing Company (1912–1914)
 Flanders (1913)  'Flanders Six' model
 Flexbi (1904)
 Flint (1923–1927)
 Flyer Motor Car Company (1913–1914)
 Forest (1905–1906) Organized in Boston. 
 Forest City (1905) Manufactured as the Jewell beginning in 1906. Organized in Cleveland, Ohio, & named for the city nickname. 
 Forsyth (circa 1896) Franklin, Minnesota; only a prototype built. 
 Forth (1905)New York company, one of two of the same name, organized by Clarence Forth. No cars built. 
 Forth (1910-1911)Mansfield, Ohio, company, one of two of the same name, organized by Clarence Forth. Only one prototype car assembled; went bankrupt late 1911. 
 Fort Pitt (1908–1910, 1911) Organized in New Kensington, Pennsylvania; moved to Pittsburgh 1911. Always known as the Pittsburgh Six 
 Foster (1889,1901–1904)
 Fostoria (1906–1907)
 Fournier-Searchmont
 Fox (1921–1923)
 Franklin (1902–1934)
 Frayer-Miller (1904–1910)
 Frazer (1946–1951)
 Frederickson (1914)
 Fredonia (1902–1904)
 Fremont (1920–1922)
 Friedman Automobile Company (1900–1903)
 Friend Motors Corporation (1920–1921)
 Fritchle Electric (1905–1920)
 Frontenac (1906–1913)
 Frontenac Motor Corporation (1921–1925)
 Frontmobile (1917–1918)
 F.R.P. (1914–1916)
 F.S. (1911–1912)
 Fuller (1908–1910)
 F.W.D. (1910–1912)  Based in Wisconsin

G

 Gabriel (1910–1912)
 Gaeth (1902–1911)
 Gale (1905–1907)
 Galloway (1908–1911)
 Gardner (1920–1931)
 Garford (1908, 1911–1913)
 Gas-au-lec (1905–1906)
 Gaslight (1960–circa 1961)
 Gasmobile (1899–1902)
 Gaylord Motor Car Company (1911–1913)
 Gaylord (1955–1956)
 Gearless (1907–1909)
 Gearless Steamer
 Gem Motor Car Company (1917–1919)
 General (1902–1904)
 General Electric (1891–1898, 1902–1903)
 General Electric (1898–1900)
 General Motors Corporation (1908–2009)
 Geneva (1901–1904)
 German-American (1902–1903)
 Geo (1989–1997)
 Geronimo (1917–1920)
 Ghent (1916–1918)
 Gillette (1916)
 Gillig (1890)
 G.J.G. (1909–1914)
 Glasspar (1949–1953)
 Gleason (1909–1913)
 Glide (1903–1920)
 Globe Four (1921–1922)
 Glover (1920–1921)
 Golden Eagle (1906)
 Graham-Paige (1928–1930; Graham 1930–1941)
 Gramm (1902)
 Granite Falls
 Grant (1913–1922)
 Graves & Condon (1908–1910))
 Gray Motor Corporation (1922–1926)
 Gray Light Car (1920)
 Great Eagle (1910–1918)
 Great Southern (1910–1914)
 Great Western (1910–1916)
 Greenleaf Cycle Company (1902)
 Gregory (1920–1922)
 Greyhound (1914–1916)
 Grinnell Electric Car Company (1910–1915)
 Griswold Motor Car Company (1907)
 Grout (1900–1912)
 Gurley (1899–1901)
 G.V (1907)
 Gyroscope (1908–1909)

H

 Haase (1902–1904)
 Hackett Motor Car Company (1916–1919)
 H.A.L. (1916–1918)
 Hall (1903–1904)
 Hall (1914–1915)
 Halladay (1905–1922)
 Hamilton (1917)
 Hamlin-Holmes (1919–1929; Hamlin 1930)
 Hammer-Sommer (1902–1906)  Renamed to Hammer Motor Company for 1905–1906
 Handley Motors Incorporated (1921–1923; Handley 1923)
 Hanger (1916)
 Hanover (1921–1927)
 Hanson (1918–1925)
 Harding (1916–1917)
 Hardy
 Harper (1907–1908)
 Harrie (1925)
 Harris (1910)
 Harrison Wagon Company (1905–1907; Harrison Motor Car Company 1907)
 Harroun Motor Sales Corporation (1917–1922)
 Harry S. Houpt Manufacturing Company: (See Houpt (1909); The "New Departure Manufacturing Company" (Bristol, Connecticut) forming of Houpt-Rockwell in 1910) Covered in the German Wikipedia
 Hartley (1895–1899)
 Hartman (1914–1918)
 Harvard (1915–1921)
 Harwood-Barley (1911–1915)
 Hasbrouck (1900–1902)
 Hatfield (1907–1908)
 Hatfield (1916–1924)
 Havers Motor Car Company (1908–1914)
 Hawk Cyclecar Company (1914)
 Hawkins Cyclecar (1914)  Xenia model
 Hawley (1906–1908)
 Hay-Berg (1907–1908)
 Haydock
 Haynes-Apperson (1896–1905; Haynes 1904–1925)
 Hayward (1913)
 H.C.S. (1920–1925)
 Healey (circa 1905–circa 1916)
 Heine-Velox (1903–1908, 1921–1923)
 Hendel (1903–1904)
 Henderson (1912–1914) 
 Henney (1921–1931)
 Henney (1960–1964)
 Henry Motor Car Company (1910–1912)
 Henry J (1951–1954)
 Hercules (1914–1915)
 Herff-Brooks (1915–1916)
 Herreshoff Motor Company (1909–1914)
 Hertel (1895–1900)
 Hertz (1924–1927)
 Heseltine (1916–1917)
 Hewitt (1906–1907)
 Hewitt-Lindstrom (1900–1901)
 Heymann (1898–1907)
 Hidley Steam Car (1901)
 Highlander (1919–1922)
 Hill (1904–1908)
 Hines (1908–1910)
 Hitchcock Motor Car Company (1909)
 Hobbie Accessible (1908–1909)
 Hoffman (1901–1904)
 Hoffman (1931)
 Holden (1915)
 Holland (1902–1903)
 Holley (1900–1904)
 Hollier (1915–1921)
 Holly Six (1913–1915)
 Holmes (1906–1907)
 Holsman (1901–1911)
 Hol-Tan (1908)
 Holyoke (1899–1903)
 Homer Laughlin (1916)
 Hoosier Scout (1914)
 Hoover (1913–1914)
 Hoskins (1920)
 Houpt (1909; Houpt-Rockwell 1910)
 House Steamer (1867)
 Howard (1895–1903)
 Howey (1907–1908)
 Hudson Motor Car Company (1909–1957)
 Huffman (1919–1925)
 Hupp Motor Car Company (1909–1940)
 Hupp-Yeats Electric Car Company (1911–1919)
 Huron River Manufacturing Company (1911–1912)
 Hydromotor Car Manufacturing Company (1914–1917)

I

 Illinois Electric (1897–1901)
 Imp (1913–1914)
 Imperial Motor Car Company (1907–1908)
 Imperial Automobile Company (1908–1916)
 Imperial (1955–1975, 1981–1983)
 Imperial Electric (1903–1904)
 Independent Harvester (1910–1911)
 Indiana (1901)
 Indianapolis (see Black)
 International (1899) (see Strathmore)
 International (1899)
 International (1900)
 International Cyclecar Company (1914)  'Economy' model
 International Motor Cars (Apollo; 1962–1964)
 International Power Company (1900)
 International (1901–1903)
 International Cyclecar Company (1914)
 International Harvester (1907–1980)
 Inter-State (1909–1919)
 Iroquois (1903–1907)

J

 Jackson Automobile Company (1903–1923)
 Jacquet Motor Corporation (1921)
 Jaeger Motor Car Company (1932–1933)
 James (1909–1911)
 Janney Motor Company (1906)
 Jarvis-Huntington (1912)
 Jaxon Steam (1903)
 Jeffery (1902–1917)
 Jenkins (1907–1912)
 Jersey City Machine Co. (1919–1920)  Argonne model
 Jewell (1906–1907; Jewel 1908–1909)
 Jewett (1922–1927)
 Johnson (1905–1912)
 Jones (1914–1920)
 Jones-Corbin (1903–1907)
 Jonz (1909–1912)
 Jordan (1916–1931)
 J.P.L. Cyclecar Company (1913)
 Julian (1918, 1925)
 Junior R (1924)

K

 Kaiser-Frazer Corporation (1945–1955; Kaiser Motors 1951–1955)
 Kalamazoo (1908–1914)  Michigan model
 Kane-Pennington
 Kansas City (1906–1908; Kansas City Wonder 1909)
 Kato (1907–1913)
 Kauffman (1909–1912)
 K-D (1912–1913)
 Kearns (1909–1916)
 Keene Steamobile (1900–1901)
 Keeton Motor Company (1912–1914)
 Keller (1948–1950)
 Kelsey (1897–1902, 1920–1924)
 Kenmore (1910–1912)
 Kensington (1899–1904)
 Kent (1916–1917)
 Kent's Pacemaker (1900)
 Kenworthy (1920–1921)
 Kermath Motor Car Company  (1907–1908)
 Kessler Motor Company (1920–1921; Kess-Line 8 1922)
 Keystone (1899–1900)
 Keystone (1900)
 Keystone (1914–1915)
 Kiblinger (1907–1909)
 Kidder (1899–1903)
 Kimball Electric (1910–1912)
 King (1896, 1911–1923)
 King Midget (1947–1970)
 King-Remick (1910)
 Kinner
 Kirk (1901–1905)  Yale model
 Kissel (1906–1930)
 Kleiber (1924–1929)
 Kline Kar (1910–1923)
 Klink (1907–1910)
 Klock (1900–1901)
 Knickerbocker (1901–1903)
 Knox (1900–1914)
 Koehler (1910–1912)
 Komet (1911)
 Konigslow
 Koppin Motor Company (1914)
 Krastin Automobile Company (1901–1904), based in Cleveland Produced Krastin Gasoline Automobile (1901)
 K-R-I-T Motor Car Company  (1909–1915)
 Krueger (1905–1906)
 Kunz (1902–1905)
 Kurtis (1949–1950, 1954–1955)
 Kurtz-Automatic (1920–1925)

L

 Laconia (1914)
 Lad's Car (1912–1914)
 LaFayette (1919–1924)
 La Marne (1919–1921)
 Lambert (1906–1917)
 Lancamobile (1900–1901)
 Lane (1900–1911)
 Lanpher (1906–1916)
 Lansden Electric (1901–1903, 1906–1910)
 La Petite (1905)
 LaSalle (1927–1940)
 La Salle-Niagara (1905–1906)
 Laurel (1916–1920)
 Lauth (1905; Lauth-Juergens 1908–1909)
 L. C. Erbes (1915–1916)
 L & E (1924–1934)
 Leach (1899–1901)
 Leach (1920–1923; Leach-Biltwell))
 Leader (1905–1912)
 Lende (1902–1909)
 Lenox (1911–1917)
 Lenox Electric
 Leon Rubay (1923)
 Lescina (1916)
 Lewis (1914–1916)
 Lewis Motocycle (1895)
 Lexington (1909–1927)
 Liberty Motor Car Company (1916–1924)
 Light Steamer (1901–1902)
 Light Motor Car Company (1914)
 Lincoln (1912–1913) (see also Sears Roebuck)
 Lincoln Motor Car Company (1914)
 Lindsley (1908–1909)
 Lion Motor Car Company (1909–1912)
 Liquid Air (1899–1902)
 Lit Motors (2010)
 Little Motor Car Company (1911–1913)
 Little Detroit Speedster (1913–1914)
 Littlemac (1930–1932)
 Locke
 Locomobile (1899–1929)
 Logan (1904–1908)
 Logan (1903–1908)
 Logan (cyclecars; 1914)
 Lone Star (1919–1922)
 Longest (1906)
 Loomis (1900–1904)
 Lorraine (1920–1922)
 Los Angeles (1914)
 Lowell-American (1908–1909)
 Lozier Motor Company (1900–1918)
 L.P.C.
 LuLu (1914–1915)
 Luverne (1904–1917)
 Lyman (1904)
 Lyman & Burnham (1903–1905)
 Lyons-Knight (1913–1915)

M

 Mackle-Thompson (1903)
 Macomber (1913)
 Macon (1915–1917)
 Madison (1915–1919)
 Magic
 Mahoning (1904–1905)
 Maibohm (1916–1922)
 Malcolm (1900)
 Malcolm Jones (or Malcolm) (1914–1915)
 Malden Steam (1898, 1902)
 Manexall (1920)  'Cyclomobile' model
 Manistee Motor Car Company (1910–1913)  Autoette model
 Marathon (1906–1914)
 Marble-Swift (1903–1905)
 Marion (1901)
 Marion (1904–1915; Marion-Handley 1916–1918)
 Marion Flyer (1910)
 Marmon (1902–1933)
 Marlboro (1900–1903)
 Marquette (1912)
 Marquette (1930)
 Marr (1903–1904)
 Marsh (1920–1923)
 Martin (1898–1900)
 Martin Wasp
 Marvel Motor Car Company (1907)
 Maryland (1907–1910)
 Maryland Steamer (1900–1901)
 Mason (1898–1899)
 Mason (1906–1914)
 Massillon (1909)
 Master (1907)
 Matheson Motor Car Company (1903–1912)
 Maxim Motor Tricycle (1895; Maxim-Goodridge Electric 1908)
 Maxwell-Briscoe (1904–1913; Maxwell Motor Company 1913–1925)
 Mayer (1899–1901)
 Mayfair (1925)
 Maytag-Mason (1910–1911)
 McCue (1909–1911)
 McCurdy (1922)
 McFarlan (1909–1928)
 McGill (1917)
 McIntyre (1909–1915)
 McKay Steamer (1899–1902)
 Mecca (1915–1916)
 Med-Bow
 Media (1899–1900)
 Mel Special (1918–1924)
 Menominee Electric Manufacturing Company (1915)
 Mercer (1909–1919)
 Mercury Cyclecar Company (1913–1914)
 Mercury (1939–2011)
 Merit Motor Company (1921–1922)
 Merkel (1905–1907)
 Merkur (1985–1989)
 Merz (1914)
 Meteor (1904–1905)
 Metropol (1913–1914)
 Metropolitan (1922–1923)
 Metz (1909–1921)
 Metzger (see Everitt)
 Michigan Automobile Company (1901)  'Carter Steam' model
 Michigan Automobile Company (1902)  Later renamed Clipper Automobile Company
 Michigan Automobile Company (1903–1908)
 Michigan Buggy Company (1908–1914)
 Michigan Steamer (1901)
 Middleby (1909–1913)
 Midland (1908–1913)
 Midwest
 Mier (1908–1909)
 Milac (1916)
 Milburn Electric (1915–1923)
 Miller Car Company (1911–1914)
 Mills (1876)
 Milwaukee Steamer (1900–1902)
 Minneapolis
 Mino (1914)
 Mitchell (1903–1923)
 Mitchell-Lewis (see Mitchell)
 Mobile (1900–1903)
 Model (1903–1907)
 Modoc (1912–1914)
 Mohawk (1903–1905)
 Moline
 Moline (1904–1913; Moline-Knight 1914–1919)
 Moller (1920–1922)
 Monarch Motor Car Company (1914–1917)
 Mondex-Magic (1914–1915)
 Monitor (1915–1922)
 Monroe Motor Company (1914–1923)
 Moon (1905–1930)
 Mora Motor Car Company (1906–1911)
 Morgan (1900–1902)
 Morris & Salom (1895–1897)
 Morriss-London (1919–1923)
 Morse (1902)
 Motor Bob (1914)
 Motorcar Company (1905–1907; Cartercar 1905–1915)
 Motorette (1911–1914)
 Moyea (1903–1904)
 Moyer (1911–1915)
 Mount Pleasant Motor Company (MPM) (1914–1915)
 Mutual Motors Company (1916–1919)
 Mueller (1896–1899; also Mueller-Benz)
 Multiplex (1912–1913)
 Muncie  'Warner' model
 Muntz (1950–1954)
 Murdaugh (1901–1903)
 Murray Motor Car Company (1916–1921; Murray-Mac 1921–1929)

N

 Nance (1911)
 Napier Motor Car Company of America (1904–1912)
 Napoleon (1916–1919)
 Nash Motors (1917–1957)
 Nash-Healey (1951–1954)
 National (1900–1924)
 Nelson (E.A.) Motor Car Company (1917–1921)
 Neustadt-Perry (1901–1908, 1915)  Also known as Neustadt.
 New England Steamer (1898–1899)
 New Era (1901–1902)
 New Era (1916)
 New Era (1933–1934)
 New Home (1899–1901)
 New York Car & Truck Company (1907–1910)  Allen Kingston model
 Niagara (1903–1905)
 Nichols Shepard (1910–1911)
 Nielson Motor Car Company (1906–1907)
 Noble (1902)
 Noma (1919–1923)
 Northern Manufacturing Company (1902–1908)
 Northway (1921–1922)
 Northwestern  'Haase' and Logan models
 Norton (1901–1902)
 Norwalk Underslung (1910–1922)
 Nu-Klea Automobile Corporation (1959–1960)
 Nyberg (1911–1913)

O

 Oakland Motor Car Company (1907–1931)
 Oakman-Hertel (1899–1900)
 Ogren (1915–1917, 1919–1923)
 Ohio (1900–1902) (see Packard)
 Ohio (1909–1912)
 Ohio Electric (1910–1918)
 Ohio Falls
 Okey (1896–1907)
 Oldsmobile (1897–2004)
 Olympian Motors Company (1917–1921)
 Omaha (1899)
 Omar (see Browniekar)
 Only (1909–1913)
 Orient (1899–1908)
 Orlo (1904)
 Ormond Steamer (1904–1905)
 Orr (1915)
 Orson (1910–1912)
 Otto (1910–1911; Ottomobile 1912)
 Otto-Kar (1902–1904)  Also known as Ottokar
 Otto-mobile (1899)
 Overholt
 Overland (1903–1926, 1939)
 O-We-Go (1914)
 Owen (1899–1901)
 Owen Motor Car Company (1910–1911)
 Owen Magnetic (1915–1922)
 Owen Schoeneck
 Owen Thomas (1908–1910)
 Oxford (1900)

P

 Paccar (1905)
 Pacific Motor Vehicle Company (1900–1904)
 Packard (1895–1898)
 Packard Motor Car Company (1899–1958)
 Paige-Detroit (1908–1911; Paige 1911–1928; Graham-Paige 1928–1930)
 Palmer (1905–1906)
 Palmer-Singer (1908–1914)
 Pan (1919–1921)
 Panam (1902–1903)
 Pan-American (1917–1922)
 Paragon (1906) 
 Parenti (1920–1922)
 Parry (1910; New Parry 1911–1912)
 Parsons Electric (1905–1906)
 Partin (1913; Partin-Palmer 1913–1917)
 Paterson (W. A.) Company (1909–1923)
 Pathfinder (1912–1917)
 Pawtucket (1901–1902)
 Payne-Modern (1907–1908)
 Peerless (1900–1933)
 Peerless Steam (1901)
 Pence Automobile Company (circa 1905)
 Penn (1901)
 Penn (1908)
 Penn (1910–1913)
 Pennant (1924–1925)
 Pennington (1894–1900)
 Pennsy (1916–1918)
 Pennsylvania (1907–1911)
 People's (1900–1902)
 Perfection (1907–1908)
 Perfex (1912–1913)
 Peter Pan (1914–1915)
 Petrel (1909–1912)
 Phelps (1903–1905)
 Phianna (1917–1922)
 Phillips (1980–198?)
 Phipps-Grinnell (1911; Phipps Electric 1912)
 Pickard (1909–1912)
 Piedmont (1917–1922)
 Pierce-Arrow (1900–1938)
 Pierce-Racine (1904–1911)
 Piggins (1908–1910)
 Pilgrim (1911)
 Pilgrim Motor Car Company (1915–1918)
 Pilliod (1915–1916)
 Pilot (1909–1924)
 Pioneer (1907–1912)
 Planche
 Plass (1897)
 Playboy (1947–1951)
 Plymouth (1910)
 Plymouth (1928–2001)
 Pneumobile (1914–1915)
 Pomeroy (1920–1924)
 Ponder (1923)  Renamed from Bour-Davis
 Pontiac Spring and Wagon Works (1907–1908)
 Pontiac (1926–2010)
 Pope-Hartford (1904–1914)
 Pope-Robinson (1903–1904)
 Pope-Toledo (1903–1909)
 Pope-Tribune (1904–1908)
 Pope-Waverley (1903–1908)
 Port Huron  Havers model
 Porter (1900–1901)
 Porter (1919–1922)
 Portland (1914)
 Postal (1906–1908)
 Powell (1930s–1960s)
 Powell (1955–1956)
 Powercar (1909–1911)
 Pratt-Elkhart (1909–1911; Pratt 1911–1915)
 Premier (1902–1926)
 Premocar (1920–1923)
 Prescott (1901–1905)
 Primo (1910–1912)
 Princess Motor Car Company (1914–1918)
 Princess Cyclecar Company (1913–1914)
 Prospect (1902, 1907–1908)
 Pullman (1905–1917)
 Pungs Finch (1904–1910)
 Puritan (1902–1905)

Q

 Queen (1904–1907)
 Quick (1899–1900)
 Quinby (1899)

R

 Railsbach (1914)
 Rainier (1905–1911)
 Raleigh (1921–1922)
 Rambler (1900–1914)
 Rambler (1958–1969)
 Randall (1902–1903)
 Ranger (1907–1910)
 Rapid Motor Vehicle Company (1902–1909)
 Rauch & Lang (1905–1932)  Also known as Raulang.
 Rayfield (1911–1915)
 R.C.H (1912–1915)
 Read Motor Company (1913–1914)
 Reading (1910–1913)
 Reading Steamer (1901–1903)
 Real Cyclecar (1914; Real Light Car 1914–1915)
 Reber (1902–1903)
 Red Bug (1924–1930)
 Red Jacket (1904–1905)
 Rees (1921)
 Reeves (1896–1898, 1905–1912)
 Regal Motor Car Company (1908–1918)
 Regas (1903–1905)
 Reliable Dayton (1906–1909)
 Reliance Automobile Manufacturing Co (1904–1906)
 Remington (1895, 1900–1904)
 REO Motor Car Company (1905–1975)
 Renaissance Cars Inc (1994–1997)  Also known as Zebra Motors Inc.
 Republic (1910–1916)
 ReVere (1918–1926)
 Rex Motor Co (1914)
 RiChard (1914–1919)
 Richelieu (1922–1923)
 Richmond (1902–1903)
 Richmond (1904–1917)
 Rickenbacker Motor Company (1922–1927)
 Ricketts Automobile Co (1909–1911)
 Riddle (1916–1926)
 Rider-Lewis (1908–1911)
 Riker Electric (1897–1902)
 Ritz (1914–1915)
 Riviera (1907)
 R-O
 Roader (1911–1912)
 Roamer (1916–1929)
 Robe (1914–1915)
 Robie Motor Car Co (1914)
 Robinson (1900–1902)
 Robson (1909)
 Rochester (1901)
 Rock Falls (1919–1925)
 Rockne (1932–1933)
 Rockway (1910–1911)
 Rockwell (1910–1911)
 Rodgers (1921)
 Roebling-Planche (1909)
 Rogers (1899–1900)  Steamobile model
 Rogers Motor Car Co (1911–1912)
 Rogers & Hanford (1899–1902)
 Rollin (1924–1927)
 Rolls-Royce (1921–1935)
 Roosevelt (1929–1930)
 Roper (1860–1896)
 Ross Steamer (1905–1909)
 Ross (1915–1918)
 Rotary (1921–1923)
 Royal Motor Company (1904–1911)  'Tourist' model
 Rubay
 Rugby (1920s)
 Rushmobile
 Russell (1903–1904)
 Rutenber (1902)
 Ruxton (1929–1930)
 R&V Knight (1920–1924)

S

 Saginaw (1914)
 Saginaw Eight (1916)
 Salisbury (1895)
 Salter (1909–1915)
 Salvador (1914; S-J-R 1915–1916)
 Sampson (1904, 1911)
 Sandusky (1902–1904)
 Santos Dumont (1902–1904)
 Saturn (1991–2010)
 Saxon Motor Car Company (1913–1923)
 Sayers (1917–1924)
 Schacht (1904–1913)
 Schaum (1901–1905)
 Schoening (1895)  'Kerosine Carriage' model
 Scott (1900–1901, 1903)
 Scott-Newcomb (1920–1921)  Standard Steam Car model
 Scripps-Booth Corporation (1913–1923)
 Searchmont (1900–1903)
 Sears (1905–1915)
 Sebring (1910–1912)
 Sekine (1923)
 Selden (1907–1914)
 Sellers (1909–1912)
 Senator (1912)
 Seneca (1917–1924)
 Serpentina (1915)
 Serrifile (1921–1922)
 Seven Little Buffaloes (1909)
 Severin (1920–1921)
 S.G.V. (1911–1915)
 Shad-Wyck (1917–1923)
 Shain
 Sharon (1915)
 Sharp (1908–1910)  'Arrow' model
 Shawmobile (1908–1930)
 Shawmut (1906–1908)
 Shay (1979–1982)
 Shelby (1903)
 Sheridan (1920–1921)
 Shoemaker (1906–1908)
 Sibley (1910–1911)
 Signet (1913-1914) 'Fenton' model
 Silent-Knight (1905–1907)
 Silent Sioux  'Fawick Flyer' model
 Silver-Knight  'Silver' model
 Simplex (1907–1919)
 Simplicity (1907–1911)
 Simplo (1908–1909)
 Sinclair-Scott (1904–circa 1907)
 Singer (1914–1920)
 Single Center (1906–1908)
 Sintz (1899–1904)
 Skelton (1920–1922)
 Skene (1900–1901)
 Skorpion (1952–1954)
 S&M (1913)
 Small Motor Car Company (1910)
 Smith Automobile Company (1902–1917)  Renamed to Great Smith for 1907–1911
 Smith & Mabley  Also known as S&M Simplex
 Smith Flyer (1915–1919)
 Snyder (1908–1909)
 Sommer (1904–1905)
 Soules Motor Car Company (1905–1908)
 Southern (1908–1909)
 Southern Motor Car Co (1908–1910)  'Dixie Junior' and 'Dixie Tourist' models.
 Sovereign (1906–1907)
 Spacke (1919)
 Spaulding (1902–1903)
 Spaulding (1910–1916)
 Speedway (1904–1905)
 Speedwell (1907–1914)
 Spencer (1921–1922)
 Spencer Steamer (1862, 1901–1902)
 Sphinx (1914–1916)
 Spoerer (1908–1914)
 Springer (1903–1905)
 Springfield (1900–1901)  Steam cars
 Sprite (1914)
 Squier (1899)
 Stafford (1908–1915)
 Stammobile (1900–1901)
 Standard (1904–1908)
 Standard (1912–1923)
 Standard Six (1909–1910)
 Standard Steel Car Company (1912–1923)
 Standard Electrique (1911–1915)  Also known as Standard Electric
 Standard Steam Car (1920–1921)
 Stanley (1907–1910)
 Stanley Steamer (1897–1927)
 Stanley Whitney (1899)
 Stanton (1900–1901)
 Stanwood (1920–1922)
 Star (1908–1909)
 Star (1922–1928)
 Starin (1903–1904)
 States (1916–1918)
 Staver (1907–1914)
 Steamobile (1900–1902)
 Stearns (1898–1911)  Became Stearns-Knight for 1912–1929.
 Stearns Electric (1899–1903)  Renamed to Stearns Steamer for 1901–1903
 Steco (1914)
 Steel Swallow (1907–1908)
 Stephens (1917–1924)
 Sterling Steamer (1901–1902)
 Sterling (1909–1911)
 Sterling (1915–1916)
 Sterling-Knight (1920–1926)
 Stevens-Duryea (1901–1915,1919–1927)
 Stewart-Coats (1922)
 Stickney Motorette (1914)
 Stilson (1907–1909)
 St. Joe (1908)
 St. Louis (1899–1907)
 Stoddard-Dayton (1904–1913)
 Storck Steamer (1901–1902)
 Storms Electric (1915)
 Stout Motor Car Company (1932–1946)
 Strathmore (1899–1901)
 Stratton (1909)
 Streator (1905–1911)  Originally called Erie Motor Carriage Co.  Halladay model.
 Stringer (1899–1902)
 Strobel & Martin
 Strong & Rogers Electric (1900–1901)
 Strouse  Also known as S.R.K.
 Studebaker (1902–1963)
 Studebaker-Garford (1903–1911)
 Studebaker-Packard Corporation (1954–1962)
 Studillac (1953–1955)
 Sturges Electric
 Sturtevant (1905–1907)
 Stutz (1911–1935)
 Stutz (1968–1987)
 Stuyvesant (1911–1912)
 Suburban (1911–1912)
 Success (1906–1909)
 Sultan (1908–1912)
 Summit (1907–1909)
 Sun (1916–1917, 1921–1922)
 Sunset (1900–1913)
 Synnestvedt Electric (1904–1905)
 Syracuse (1899–1903)

T

 Tarkington (1922–1923)
 Taunton (1901–1903)  Steam cars
 Templar (1917–1924)
 Templeton-Dubrie (1910)
 Terraplane (1932–1939)
 Terwilliger (1904)  Empire Steamer model
 Texan (1920–1922)
 Thomas (1902–1919)
 Thomas-Detroit (1906–1908)
 Thompson (1901–1907)  Steam cars
 Thresher Electric (1900)
 Tiffany Electric (1913–1914)
 Tiger (1914–1915)
 Tincher (1903–1909)
 Tinker & Piper Steam (1899)
 Tinkham (1898–1899)
 Toledo (1901–1903)
 Tonawanda
 Torbensen (1902–1906)
 Touraine (1912–1916)
 Tourist (1902–1910)
 Tractmobile (1900–1902)
 Trask-Detroit (1922–1923)
 Traveler (1907–1908)
 Trebert (1907–1908)
 Trimoto (1900–1901)  Also known as Tri-Motor
 Trinity Steamer
 Triumph (1907–1912)
 Trumbull (1914–1915)
 Tucker (1946–1949)
 Tulsa (1918–1922)
Twentieth Century Motor Car Corporation (1974-1978)
 Twin City (1914)
 Twombly (1913–1915)
 Twyford (1899–1902, 1904–1907)

U

 US Automobile (1899–1901)
 Union (1902–1905)
 United (1919–1920)
 United States (1899–1903)  Electric cars
 United States Long Distance
 Unito (1908–1910)
 Universal (1914)
 Upton Machine Company (1902–1903)
 Upton Motor Company (1905–1907)

V

 Van (1911–1912)
 Van Wagoner (1899–1903)
 Vaughn (1909)
 V.E. (1901–1906)  Also known as V.E.C. Electric
 Vector (1971–1999, 2006–2010)
 Velie (1908–1929)
 Vernon (Able 8; 1918–1921)
 Victor (1905–1911)
 Victor Page Motors Corp (1921–1924)
 Victor Steamer (1899–1903)   Previously Overman Steam (1895–1898)
 Victormobile (1900–1901)  'Steamer' model
 Victory (1920–1921)
 Viking (1907–1908)
 Viking (1929–1931)
 Virginian (1911–1912)
 Vixen (1914–1916)
 Vulcan (1913–1915)

W

 Waco (1915–1917)
 Wagenhals (1910–1915)
 Wahl (1913–1914)
 Waldron (1908–1911)
 Walker Motor Car Company (1905–1906)
 Wall (1900–1903)
 Walter (1902–1909)
 Waltham Steam (1898–1902)
 Waltham Manufacturing Co (1899–1910)  'Orient' model
 Walworth (1904–1905)
 Ward (1913–1914)
 Ward Electric (1914–1916)
 Ware Steam Wagon (1861–1867)
 Warren (1910–1913)
 Warwick (1901–1905)
 Washington (1921–1924)
 Wasp (1919–1924)
 Waterloo (1903–1905)
 Watrous (1905)
 Watt (1910)
 Waukesha (1906–1910)
 Waverley Electric (1898–1903, 1909–1916)
 Webb Jay (1908)
 Weidely Motor Company (1915-1917)
 Welch Motor Car Company (1901–1911)
 Westcott (1909–1925)
 Westfield (1901–1903)
 W.F.S. (1911–1912)
 Whaley-Henriette (1898–1900)
 Wharton (1922–1923)
 Wheeler Manufacturing Company (1904)
 Whippet (1927–1931)
 White Motor Company (1900–1918)
 White Star (1909–1911)
 Whiting Motor Car Co (1910–1912)
 Whitmore, M.C. Co (1914)  Arrow Cyclecar model
 Whitney (1896–1900)
 Wilcox (1909–1910)
 Wildman (1902)
 Wills (C. H.) and Company (1921–1927)
 Willys (1916–1918, 1930–1942, 1953–1963)
 Willys-Knight (1914–1933)
 Willys-Overland (1912–1953)
 Wilson (1903–1905)
 Windsor (1929–1930)
 Wing (1922)
 Winther (1921–1923)
 Winton (1896–1924)
 Wolfe (1907–1909)
 Wolverine (1904–1906,1927–1928)
 Woodill (1952–1956)
 Woodruff (1902–1904)
 Woods Electric (1899–1916)  Renamed to Woods Dual Power for 1917–1918
 Woods Mobilette (1913–1916)
 Worth (J.M.) Gas Engine Manufacturing Co (1902)
 Worth (1906–1910)

X

 Xander (1901–1902)

Y

 Yale
 Yellow (1915–1930)

Z

 Zehr (1912–1915)
 Zent (1900–1902, 1904–1906)
 Zentmobile (1903)
 Zimmer Motorcars (1978–1988)
 Zimmerman (1908–1915)
 Zip (1913–1914)

See also 
 List of automobile manufacturers
 List of automobile manufacturers of the United States
 List of motorcycle manufacturers
 List of pickup trucks
 List of American truck manufacturers
 List of truck manufacturers

Notes

Sources 
 Automobile Quarterly (eds.). The American Car Since 1775. Kutztown, PA: Automobile Quarterly, Inc., 1971. 
 Bird, Anthony and Douglas-Scott Montagu of Beaulieu, Edward: Steam Cars, 1770–1970, Littlehampton Book Services Ltd., 1971. : 
 Clymer, Floyd. Treasury of Early American Automobiles, 1877–1925. New York: Bonanza Books, 1950.
 Clymer, Floyd and Gahagan, Harry W.:  Floyd Clymer's Steam Car Scrapbook, Literary Licensing, LLC, 2012. ; 
 Georgano, Nick (Ed.). The Beaulieu Encyclopedia of the Automobile. Chicago: Fitzroy Dearborn, 2000. 
 Evans, Richard J.: Steam Cars (Shire Album), Shire Publications Ltd (booklet) 1985. ; 
 Headfield, John: American Steam-Car Pioneers: A Scrapbook (1st edition). Newcomen Society in North, 1984. ; 
 Kimes, Beverly R. (editor), and Clark, Henry A. The Standard Catalog of American Cars 1805–1945. Krause Publications, 1975.  
 Kimes, Beverly R. (editor), and Clark, Henry A. The Standard Catalog of American Cars 1805–1945. Krause Publications, 1985. 
 Kimes, Beverly R., and Clark, Henry A. The Standard Catalog of American Cars 1805–1942 (3rd edition).  Iola, WI: Krause, 1996. 
 Kirsch, David A.: The Electric Vehicle and the Burden of History. Rutgers University Press, New Brunswick NJ and London, 2000. 

Automobile manufacturers, United States
Lists of automobile manufacturers